Chris Sirleaf Dukuly (born November 15, 1985) is a Liberian footballer.

International career
He has been capped twice for Liberia.

External links
 

1985 births
Living people
Liberian footballers
Liberian expatriates in Ivory Coast
Association football midfielders
Expatriate footballers in Ivory Coast
Séwé Sport de San-Pédro players
Liberia international footballers